Duke Benedict of Halland and Finland (c. 1330 – c. 1360), aka Bengt Algotsson, was a medieval Swedish lord, and royal favourite.

He was born to a family who descended from Svantepolk of Skarsholm and his wife Benedikta Sunadotter. Svantepolk had been the younger son of Canute, Duke of Reval, Laland and Belinge (possibly also Halland), a bastard of Valdemar II of Denmark with Helena Guttormsdatter, daughter of a Swedish earl. Benedikta was the sister-in-law of King Eric XI and daughter of earl Sune Folkason, justiciar of Västergötland, with his wife Helena Sverkersdotter, herself the daughter of Sverker II of Sweden and his first wife Benedikte Ebbesdotter of the Galen. This made Benedict as one of the noblest blood of Sweden of his time.

The rumors of improper relations between king Magnus IV of Sweden and Queen Blanche originate from the  pamphlet Libellus Magno Erici, but have most likely no factual basis.

His coat of arms was a standing lion; thus, the family has in some later reconstructions been called Lejon. This may also mean they were kin with the Folkunge, his line's ancestress belonging to those siblings of Boberg family who were nephews and nieces of Birger jarl.

His paternal great-grandfather was Bengt Magnusson, justice of Östergötland.

His kinship with the royal family (he was at least a distant cousin of Magnus, fourth cousin counted from Danish kings) and with other noble families of the country is presumed as the reason for the young man's exceptionally rapid rise.

From 1352 he is known to have had a seat in the kingdom's Privy Council.

Duke Benedict was married to Ingeborg Ulvsdotter of Tofta, a member of the Sparre family.  She was much older than he, possibly already a widow.  Ingeborg was the daughter of Ulf Abjörnsson, justiciar of Tiohärad, the younger half-sister of Lord Karl of Tofta, maternal niece of Erengisle, Earl of Orkney, and the aunt of the future Margaret Sparre of Tofta, mother of Charles VIII of Sweden and ancestress of Gustav Vasa.

In about 1353, the king created Benedict Duke of Finland and Halland.  The title of Halland came from his descent from Duke Canute of Reval whose male line, which had held Halland as compensation for Reval and Laland, had gone extinct some fifty years earlier. Previous holders of the duchy of Halland had been the king's own father Duke Eric, his mother Duchess Ingeborg, and Ingeborg's second husband Knut Porse, as well as king's half-brothers.

Benedict was also appointed Viceroy of Scania, the newly acquired group of mostly Danish provinces.

Most probably, the chief reasons the king took these steps were to stop the spiritual and secular frälse, to gain yet more power at royal expense, and Hanseatic power in Nordic commerce. (Their personal relationship was also rumored at the time to be the reason.) The Viceroy confiscated many of the properties of the Archdiocese of Lund upon the death of Archbishop Peder Jensen in 1355. Hanseatic privileges were also curbed in Skanish ports.

However, Benedict repudiated his wife sometime in 1356, one of the reasons his noble relatives did not protect him.  His wife's relatives became his enemies, and the duke was driven into exile.  A civil war started at about the same time: leaders of Swedish nobility used the king's eldest son Eric as claimant and cited the favorite's exceptional privileges as an insult to the younger king. In 1356 a revolt started, nominally against Duke Benedict, but actually to weaken the king and his centralizing grip.

In 1357, Benedict was exiled and Scania as well as several other Swedish and Finnish provinces were given to the young king Eric.  Duke Benedict's elder brother Lord Knut was exiled to Norway with his wife Märta Ulvsdotter, a daughter of St Bridget of Sweden.

Benedict probably lived in Denmark. In c 1360, Benedict returned to Sweden, but according to tradition was besieged in Rönneholm castle in Scania and eventually killed by his brother-in-law Lord Karl Ulvsson and Magnus Nilsson Röde.

	

1330 births
1360 deaths
Swedish nobility
People of medieval Finland
14th-century Swedish people
Dukes of Halland